Dan Meyerstein FRSC (born in 1938 in Jerusalem) is an Israeli academic and former president of Ariel University.

Biography
Meyerstein was born in Jerusalem in Mandatory Palestine.  He earned an M.Sc. from The Hebrew University of Jerusalem in Physical Chemistry (1961), and a Ph.D. in chemistry from the school as well (1965).

Meyerstein is Professor Emeritus of Ben-Gurion University of the Negev a member of the Academia Europaea, the American Chemical Society, and the Royal Society of Chemistry.

In 2004, Meyerstein opened the third annual David Bar-Illan Conference on the Media. Concerning the demographics of Israel, Meyerstein has stated that the birthrate in the Judea and Samaria District is "crazily higher than the rest of Israel."

Views and opinions
On academic boycotts of Israel, Meyerstein stated in The Jerusalem Post that, "I feel that many of the people involved in this boycott have little knowledge of the system here and those that do have knowledge also have the desire to abolish the state of Israel. I have always felt boycotts were a bit like burning books. This happened in Europe 70 years ago and it is part of the reason I live in Israel".

References

External links
Curriculum Vitae

1938 births
Ariel University
Academic staff of Ben-Gurion University of the Negev
Hebrew University of Jerusalem alumni
Members of Academia Europaea
Fellows of the American Chemical Society
Fellows of the Royal Society of Chemistry
Israeli Jews
Living people
Israeli scientists
Jewish scientists
Israeli chemists
Jewish chemists
Presidents of universities in Israel